Jang Kyung-gu (born 19 May 1990) is a South Korean road bicycle racer. He competed in the road race competition of 2010 and 2014 Asian Games, finishing 13th and first respectively. He is the first Korean athlete to win a gold medal in the cycling road race since Kim Yong-mi in the women's road race at the 2002 Asian Games.

Major results

2010
 7th Overall Tour de Korea
1st Stage 7
2011
 1st Overall Tour de Hokkaido
 4th Road race, Asian Road Championships
2012
 4th Overall Tour de Korea
1st Young rider classification
 Asian Road Championships
8th Road race
8th Time trial
2014
 1st  Road race, Asian Games
 Tour de Korea
1st Mountains classification
1st Stage 6
 5th Road race, Asian Road Championships
2015
 1st  Time trial, National Road Championships
 1st Mountains classification Tour de Korea
2016
 1st Stage 6 Tour de Singkarak
 3rd Time trial, National Road Championships
2017
 1st  Road race, National Road Championships
2018
 2nd Time trial, National Road Championships
 6th Road race, Asian Games
2021
 1st  Road race, National Road Championships

References

External links

1990 births
Living people
Asian Games medalists in cycling
Cyclists at the 2010 Asian Games
Cyclists at the 2014 Asian Games
Asian Games gold medalists for South Korea
Medalists at the 2014 Asian Games
Cyclists at the 2018 Asian Games